Kalispell Medical Equipment is a durable medical equipment supplier in Kalispell, Montana. Kalispell Medical Equipment is a division of Kalispell Regional Healthcare, which was transferred from the Sisters of Mercy's ownership to the community of Kalispell in 1973. Kalispell Medical Equipment was created in 1994. KRH is the largest employer in Northwest Montana, employing upwards of 2900 people and is the largest medical equipment supplier to Northwest Montana, providing rehab mobility products such as wheelchairs and scooters, oxygen concentrators, and ambulatory aids such as walkers. Kalispell Medical Equipment services nearly 20,000 square miles and 170,000 people around the Flathead Valley, including Flathead County, Lake County, and Lincoln County.

KME is a member of the Kalispell Chamber of Commerce. It is fully accredited as a Durable Medical Equipment Company by the Healthcare Quality Association on Accreditation. Kalispell Regional Healthcare has received an A− rating with the Better Business Bureau.

References

External links
 Official Site

Medical technology companies of the United States
Kalispell, Montana